Carlos Garcia-Knight (born 6 May 1997) is a New Zealand snowboarder. He competed in the 2018 Winter Olympics where he made the final of the men's slopestyle.

Personal life
Garcia-Knight's father emigrated to New Zealand from Cadiz, Spain.

References

External links
 
 Snow Sports NZ profile 
 
 

1997 births
Living people
Snowboarders at the 2018 Winter Olympics
New Zealand male snowboarders
New Zealand people of Spanish descent
Olympic snowboarders of New Zealand
Sportspeople from Christchurch